Nettlestone and Seaview is a civil parish and  electoral ward on the Isle of Wight. It contains the villages of Nettlestone and Seaview.

Public Transport is provided by Southern Vectis bus route 8, which operates between Ryde, and Newport via Bembridge and Sandown.

History 
The parish was formed from the unparished area of Ryde on 1 April 1989 as "Seaview", the parish was then renamed to "Nettlestone and Seaview" on 15 May 1989.

Freedom of the Parish
The following people and military units have received the Freedom of the Parish of Nettlestone and Seaview.

Individuals
 Roy Hayward: 14 November 2022.

References

Civil parishes in the Isle of Wight